Nyctopais mysticus is a species of beetle in the family Cerambycidae. It was described by Karl Jordan in 1894. It is known from Ghana, Cameroon, Gabon, Benin, Nigeria, the Democratic Republic of the Congo, and Togo. It contains the variety Nyctopais mysticus var. itzingeri.

References

Tragocephalini
Beetles described in 1894